Yūsuf ibn ʿAbd Allāh ibn Muḥammad ibn ʿAbd al-Barr, Abū ʿUmar al-Namarī al-Andalusī al-Qurṭubī al-Mālikī, commonly known as Ibn ʿAbd al-Barr  was an eleventh-century Arab Maliki scholar and Athari theologian who served as the Qadi of Lisbon.

Biography
Ibn 'Abd al-Barr was born in 978 and died in 1071 in Xàtiva in Al-Andalus. According to Ibn Khallikan, Ibn Abd al-Barr sprung from the Arabian tribe of Namr ibn Qasit.

While initially having been an adherent of the Zahirite school of Muslim jurisprudence, Ibn Abd al-Barr later switched to the Maliki school, which was the officially recognized legal code of the Umayyad dynasty, under which he lived. His book on the three great Sunni jurists Malik ibn Anas, Al-Shafi'i and Abu Hanifa noticeably excluded both his former patron Dawud al-Zahiri and Ahmad ibn Hanbal. Ibn 'Abd al-Barr was a strong opponent of the practice of Taqlid (blind-imitation) and represented the traditionalist strand of the Maliki school. He is often referred to as the "Bukhari of the West."

Works
Some of his works include:
The Comprehensive Compilation of the Names of the Prophet's Companions . In it, the author intended to list every person who met Muhammad even once in their life;

 Al-Ajwiba al-Mû`iba ("The Comprehensive Answers");
 Al-`Aql wal-`Uqalâ' ("Reason and the People of Wisdom");
 Ash`âr Abî al-`Atâhiya ("The Poems of Abû al-`Atahiya[12]");
 Al-Bayân fî Tilâwat al-Qur'an ("The Exposition Concerning the Recitation of the Qur'ân");
 Al-Farâ'id ("The Laws of Inheritance");
 Al-Iktifâ' fî Qirâ'at Nâfi`in wa Abî `Amrin ("The Contentment in Nâfi` and Abû `Amr's Reading");
 Al-Inbâh `an Qabâ'il al-Ruwâh ("Drawing Attention to the Nomenclature of the Narrators' Tribes");
 Al-Insâf fî Asmâ' Allâh ("The Book of Fidelity: On the Names of Allâh");
 Al-Intiqâ' fî Fadâ'il al-Thalâthat al-A'immat al-Fuqahâ' Mâlik wal-Shâfi`î wa Abî Hanîfa ("The Hand-Picked Excellent Merits of the Three Great Jurisprudent Imâms: Mâlik, Shâfi`î, and Abû Hanîfa"). Shaykh `Abd al-Fattâh Abû Ghudda said the order in the title reflects the precedence of Madîna over Makka and that of Makka over al-Kûfa.
 Al-Istidhkâr li Madhhab `Ulamâ' al-Amsâr fîmâ Tadammanahu al-Muwatta' min Ma`ânî al-Ra'î wal-Athâr ("The Memorization of the Doctrine of the Scholars of the World Concerning the Juridical Opinions and the Narrations Found in Mâlik's Muwatta'");
 Jâmi` Bayân al-`Ilmi wa-Fadlihi wamâ Yanbaghî fî Riwâyatihi wa Hamlih ("Compendium Exposing the Nature of Knowledge and Its Immense Merit, and What is Required in the Process of Narrating it and Conveying it");
 Al-Kâfî fî Madhhab Mâlik ("The Sufficiency in Mâlik's School of Jurisprudence");
 Al-Kunâ ("The Patronyms");
 Al-Maghâzî ("The Battles");
 Al-Qasd wal-Umam fî Nasab al-`Arab wal-`Ajam ("The Endeavors and the Nations: Genealogies of the Arabs and Non-Arabs");
 Al-Shawâhid fî Ithbât Khabar al-Wâhid ("The Supporting Evidence for Maintaining Lone-Narrator Reports [as a source for legal rulings]");
 Al-Tamhîd limâ fîl-Muwatta' min al-Ma`ânî wal-Asânîd ("The Facilitation to the Meanings and Chains of Transmission Found in Mâlik's Muwatta'");
 Al-Taqassî fî Ikhtisâr al-Muwatta' ("The Detailed Study in the Abridgment of the Muwatta'");

See also
 
Islamic scholars

References

External links
 Full biography by Shaykh Jibrîl Al Haddâd  
 Biography of Imam Ibn 'Abd Il Barr by at-tawhid.net 
 The Belief of Imam Ibn Abd Al Barr 

978 births
1071 deaths
10th-century Arabs
11th-century Arabs
Maliki scholars from al-Andalus
11th-century writers from al-Andalus
Hadith scholars
Atharis
11th-century jurists
Biographical evaluation scholars
People from Lisbon